Barbados–Mexico relations are the diplomatic relations between Barbados and the United Mexican States. Both nations are members of the Association of Caribbean States, Organization of American States and the United Nations.

History
Barbados and Mexico established diplomatic relations on 11 September 1972. Relations between both nations have taken place in primarily multilateral forums. In January 1984, Mexico opened an honorary consulate in Bridgetown. In May 2002, Barbadian Prime Minister Owen Arthur paid a visit to Mexico to attend the Monterrey Consensus summit held in the northern Mexican city of Monterrey. In June 2002, Mexican Foreign Minister Jorge Castañeda Gutman paid a visit to Barbados to attend the 32nd General Assembly of the Organization of American States held in Bridgetown.

In February 2010, Barbadian Prime Minister David Thompson paid a visit to Cancún to attend the Mexico-Caribbean Community (CARICOM) summit. In May 2012, Mexican President Felipe Calderón paid a visit to Barbados to attend the Caribbean Community summit in Bridgetown.

In June 2014, the honorary consul of Mexico in Barbados, Sir Trevor Carmichael, was presented with Mexico's highest decoration for foreigners, the Order of the Aztec Eagle by Mexican Foreign Minister José Antonio Meade. The award recognized Sir Trevor's outstanding role in working to promote business, culture and tourism between Barbados and Mexico, as well as providing an outstanding level of consular attention. Each year, the Mexican government offers scholarships for nationals of Barbados to study postgraduate studies at Mexican higher education institutions.

High-level visits
High-level visits from Barbados to Mexico
 Prime Minister Owen Arthur (2002)
 Prime Minister David Thompson (2010)
 Foreign Minister Jerome Walcott (2021)

High-level visits from Mexico to the Barbados
 Foreign Minister Jorge Castañeda Gutman (2002)
 President Felipe Calderón (2012)

Bilateral agreements
Both nations have signed a few bilateral agreements such an Agreement on Scientific and Technical Cooperation (1995) and an Agreement to Avoid Double Taxation and Prevent Tax Evasion in Income Tax Matters (2008).

Trade
In 2018, trade between Barbados and Mexico totaled US$12 million. Barbados' main exports to Mexico include: power surges, paper, vulcanized rubber, and electrical transformers. Mexico's main exports to Barbados include: refrigerators and freezers; screens and projectors; washing and drying machines; telephones and mobile phones; and stoves. Between 1999 and 2017, Barbados' direct investment in Mexico totaled US$76 million. There are 35 Barbadian companies operating in Mexico. Mexican multinational company Cemex operates in Barbados.

Diplomatic missions
 Barbados is accredited to Mexico from its embassy in Washington, D.C., United States.
 Mexico is accredited to Barbados from its embassy in Port of Spain, Trinidad and Tobago and maintains an honorary consulate in Bridgetown.

References 

Mexico
Barbados